Pavle Propadalo (born 24 November 1994) is a Serbian football midfielder who is currently a free agent.

Career
Born in Čačak, Propadalo passed Borac Čačak youth school. He had signed with a three-year contract with Košice in summer 2013, but he moved in Bežanija next year. Later, same year, he spent some period with OFK Beograd. Pavle joined Metalac Gornji Milanovac beginning of 2015, where he stayed until the end of 2014–15 season. He returned in Borac Čačak in summer 2015.

References

External links
 
 Pavle Propadalo stats at utakmica.rs 
 
 

1994 births
Living people
Sportspeople from Čačak
Association football midfielders
Serbian footballers
Serbian expatriate footballers
Serbian expatriate sportspeople in Slovakia
Expatriate footballers in Slovakia
FC VSS Košice players
FK Bežanija players
OFK Beograd players
FK Metalac Gornji Milanovac players
FK Borac Čačak players
FK Radnik Surdulica players
FK Dinamo Vranje players
Serbian First League players
Serbian SuperLiga players